The Anderson Site is a property in Franklin, Tennessee, United States, that was listed on the National Register of Historic Places in 1990. It is an Archaic period site.

References

Archaeological sites on the National Register of Historic Places in Tennessee
Geography of Williamson County, Tennessee
National Register of Historic Places in Williamson County, Tennessee